L'Indépendance Roumanie ('The Independence of Romania') was a French language liberal daily newspaper published from Bucharest. The newspaper was founded in 1877.

References

French-language newspapers published in Europe
Newspapers published in Bucharest
1877 establishments in Romania